Jagielnik  is a settlement in the administrative district of Gmina Barwice, within Szczecinek County, West Pomeranian Voivodeship, in north-western Poland. Between 1975 and 1998 the town administratively belonged to the Koszalin voivodeship.

For the history of the region, see History of Pomerania.

References

Jagielnik